Kenneth M. Schricker (February 28, 1921 – March 1, 1978) was a member of the Wisconsin State Assembly. Schricker was elected to the Assembly in 1974, defeating Howard W. Cameron. He was a Republican.

Career
Born in Washburn County, Wisconsin, Schricker served in the United States Navy Air Corps during World War II. Schricker was a locomotive engineer. He also served on the Spooner Town Board. He died while still in office.

References

People from Spooner, Wisconsin
1921 births
1978 deaths
20th-century American politicians
United States Navy personnel of World War II
Republican Party members of the Wisconsin State Assembly